Berrya cordifolia, the Trincomalee wood, is a species of tree native to much of tropical Asia and introduced to Africa. It is also found in the forests of Christmas Island.
It is widely used for timber, and its bark is used for fibers. The wood has a number of uses, including furniture and historical applications in shipbuilding. It grows up to 27 meters tall.

References

External links
Wood Explorer Profile

Brownlowioideae
Flora of tropical Asia
Flora of Christmas Island
Plants described in 1801